Robbie Beckett (born July 16, 1972) is a former Major League Baseball pitcher.

Career
In 1990, he was drafted in the first round (25th) by the San Diego Padres in the amateur draft out of McCallum High School in Austin, Texas. Starting out for the Rancho Cucamonga Quakes in the Padre's farm system, he was soon well known for his impressive 100 mph fastballs at the young age of 21. During one stretch of his stint at the Quakes, he was able to throw 88 strikeouts in 84 innings.  However, Beckett's extreme fastballs were counterbalanced by his poor control.  During one spring training session, veteran MLB hitters refused to go to bat against such a powerful and erratic pitch and risk injury so early in the season.  Unable to make progress in the Padres farm system, the team waived Beckett on March 29, 1996. The Florida Marlins picked Beckett up but soon waived him also. After Florida, the Colorado Rockies selected Beckett off waivers. Beckett made his Major League debut with the Rockies on September 12, 1996, when he was only 24 years old. Robbie Beckett was a left-handed pitcher, but batted with his right. Beckett only played in a total of 7 games (none of which he started), and was released from the Colorado Rockies on September 26, 1997.

References

External links

Major League Baseball pitchers
1972 births
Living people
Colorado Rockies players
Baseball players from Austin, Texas
Albuquerque Dukes players
American expatriate baseball players in Mexico
Arizona League Padres players
Charleston Rainbows players
Colorado Springs Sky Sox players
Las Vegas Stars (baseball) players
Memphis Chicks players
New Haven Ravens players
Pericos de Puebla players
Portland Sea Dogs players
Rancho Cucamonga Quakes players
Riverside Red Wave players
San Antonio Missions players
Waterloo Diamonds players
Wichita Wranglers players